Leninsky (masculine), Leninskaya (feminine), or Leninskoye (neuter) may refer to:
Leninsky District (disambiguation), several districts in the countries of the former Soviet Union
Leninsky Okrug (disambiguation), various divisions in Russia
Leninsky Urban Settlement (or Leninskoye Urban Settlement), several municipal urban settlements in Russia
Leninski, Belarus (Leninsky), a settlement in Belarus
Leninsky, Russia (Leninskaya, Leninskoye), several inhabited localities in Russia
Leninsky Avenue (disambiguation), several avenues in Russian cities
Leninskaya Line, a line of the Novosibirsk Metro, Novosibirsk, Russia
Leninskaya (Nizhny Novgorod Metro), a station of the Nizhny Novgorod Metro, Nizhny Novgorod, Russia
Leninska (Leninskaya), prior to 1992, name of Teatralna station of the Kyiv Metro, Kyiv, Ukraine
Leninskoye, Kazakhstan, a locality in Aktobe Province, Kazakhstan

Vladimir Lenin